Jumpasri United (formerly Osotspa Samut Prakan) is a Thai football club based in Mahasarakham. In 2017, Super Power Samut Prakan leaving Samut Prakan Province and move to Maha Sarakham Province by merge with Jumpasri United. This moving was off the legend Osotspa Football Club or Super Power Samut Prakan one of the longest established football club in Thailand since 1977 with financial problems and sponsor support issues.

History
In the end of season 2017, Super Power Samut Prakan F.C. announced its intent to relocate to Maha Sarakham Province and merge with Jumpasri United, the club that played at that time in Thailand Amateur League and moved ground to Mahasarakham Province Stadium after receiving permission to do so from Football Association of Thailand.

In 2018, Club-licensing of this team didn't pass to play 2018 Thai League 2. This team is banned 2 years and Relegated to 2020 Thai League 4 North Eastern Region.

Stadium and locations

Season by season record

P = Played
W = Games won
D = Games drawn
L = Games lost
F = Goals for
A = Goals against
Pts = Points
Pos = Final position
N/A = No answer

TA = Thailand Amateur League

QR1 = First Qualifying Round
QR2 = Second Qualifying Round
QR3 = Third Qualifying Round
QR4 = Fourth Qualifying Round
RInt = Intermediate Round
R1 = Round 1
R2 = Round 2
R3 = Round 3

R4 = Round 4
R5 = Round 5
R6 = Round 6
GR = Group stage
QF = Quarter-finals
SF = Semi-finals
RU = Runners-up
S = Shared
W = Winners

References

External links
 Official Fanpage

Thai League 1 clubs
 
Football clubs in Thailand
Association football clubs established in 1977
Sport in Bangkok
Saraburi province
1977 establishments in Thailand